The Kiss is a 1958 short film written and produced by John Hayes. It was the first major film by Hayes, who would go on to find fame as the writer, producer, and director of B-movie genre films such as Garden of the Dead.

The film was nominated for the 1958 Academy Award for Best Live Action Short Film but lost to Disney's Grand Canyon.

See also
 List of American films of 1958

References

External links

External links

1958 short films
1958 films
1958 comedy films
American comedy short films
1950s English-language films
1950s American films